Venice is a village in the province of Mashonaland West, Zimbabwe. It is located about 30 km south-east of Kadoma. According to the 1982 Population Census, the village had a population of 3,306. The village grew up as a residential and commercial centre for the Venice gold mine.

Populated places in Mashonaland West Province